This is a List of football clubs in Venezuela. Football in Venezuela (association football) is one of Venezuela's most popular sports.

 ACD Lara
 Aragua
 Atlético El Vigía
 Atlético Venezuela
 Carabobo
 Caracas
 Caroní
 Deportivo Anzoátegui
 Deportivo Petare
 Deportivo Táchira
 Estudiantes de Mérida
 Mineros de Guayana
 Monagas
 Real Esppor
 Trujillanos
 Yaracuyanos
 Zamora
 Zulia

Venezuela
 
Clubs
Football clubs